"How Do I Get There" is a song written by Chris Farren, and co-written and recorded by American country music artist Deana Carter.

It was released in 1996 as a 7" jukebox single along with the song "Did I Shave My Legs for This?", and in 1997 as a promotional CD single. The song became her third single to reach the top of the Billboard Hot Country Singles & Tracks chart.  The song was Carter's last Number One hit on the country chart.

Track listing

Chart performance 
"How Do I Get There" debuted at number 52 on the U.S. Billboard Hot Country Singles & Tracks for the chart week of August 2, 1997.

Year-end charts

References

Deana Carter songs
Songs written by Deana Carter
Songs written by Chris Farren (country musician)
Song recordings produced by Chris Farren (country musician)
1996 songs
Capitol Records Nashville singles